Snook is a Swedish rap group from Stockholm. The group consists of Oskar "Kihlen" Linnros and Daniel "Danne" Adams-Ray. The group often makes fun of traditional rap and tries to reinvent it. They have released two full-length albums and several singles.

In the 2006 MTV Europe Music Awards in Copenhagen, they won the award for Best Swedish Act.

Linnros and Adams-Ray met in high school, Viktor Rydberg Gymnasium Odenplan. They formed Snook (snok is a Swedish slang term for "nose") in 2000. The group's first single 1990 nånting (Eng: "1990 something"), featuring Afasi & Filthy, became a big hit in Sweden. They were critically acclaimed because of their  different sound as compared to the general Swedish hip-hop. Their debut album Vi vet inte vart vi ska, men vi ska komma dit (Eng: "We don't know where we're going, but we will get there") was released in May 2004, and was one of the most praised records in Sweden that year. Snook received a P3 Guld award for their hit "Mister Cool" (Mr. Cool).

The group Snook is currently not active. Linnros has made a solo album called Vilja Bli (Want to Become); a move away from hip-hop, the album consists of ten soul-pop songs. It was released on 9 June 2010. Six months later, Adams-Ray released an album called Svart, Vitt och allt därimellan (Black, White and Everything in Between).

Snook was mentioned in John Green's book The Fault In Our Stars in 2012.

Discography

Albums

Singles
Charting

Others
2004: "Lejonhjärta" feat. Organism 12
2003: "1990 Nånting" feat. Afasi & Filthy
2004: "Såpbubblor"
2006: "Längst fram i taxin"
2006: "Kommer ifrån"
2007: "Inga problem"
2007: "Inga problem (Remix)" feat. Veronica Maggio & Petter

See also 
 Swedish hip hop

References 

Swedish hip hop groups
Singers from Stockholm
Swedish-language singers
MTV Europe Music Award winners